Arne Jacobsen (born 12 June 1942) is a Danish archer. He competed at the 1972 Summer Olympics and the 1976 Summer Olympics.

References

1942 births
Living people
Danish male archers
Olympic archers of Denmark
Archers at the 1972 Summer Olympics
Archers at the 1976 Summer Olympics
Sportspeople from Aarhus
20th-century Danish people